The National Maritime Union (NMU) was an American labor union founded in May 1937. It affiliated with the Congress of Industrial Organizations (CIO) in July 1937. After a failed merger with a different maritime group in 1988, the union merged with the Seafarers International Union of North America in 2001.

Early years

The NMU was founded in May 1937 by Joseph Curran and his allies, which at the time included Jack Lawrenson. At the time Curran was an able seaman and boatswain aboard the Panama Pacific Line ocean liner . He was a member of the International Seamen's Union (ISU) but was not active in the work of the union. Lawrenson later married writer Helen Lawrenson. He was forced out of the union in 1947, and according to his wife, Curran essentially wrote Lawrenson out of the union's history.

From March 1 to March 4, 1936, Curran led a strike aboard California, then docked in San Pedro, Los Angeles, California. Curran and the crew of California went on what was essentially a sitdown strike at sailing time, refusing to cast off the lines unless wages were increased and overtime paid.

United States Secretary of Labor Frances Perkins personally intervened to resolve the strike. Speaking to the crew by telephone, Perkins agreed to arrange a grievance hearing once the ship docked at its destination in New York City, and that there would be no reprisals by the company or government against Curran and the strikers.

On Californias return trip, Panama Pacific Line raised wages by $5 a month to $60 per month. However, United States Secretary of Commerce Daniel Roper and the Panama Pacific Line declared Curran and the strikers mutineers. Curran and other top strike leaders were fined two days' pay, fired and blacklisted, but Perkins was able to keep the strikers from being prosecuted for mutiny.

Seamen all along the East Coast struck to protest the treatment of the California'''s crew. Curran became a leader of the 10-week strike, eventually forming a supportive association known as the Seamen's Defense Committee. In October 1936, Curran called a second strike, the 1936 Gulf Coast maritime workers' strike, in part to improve working conditions and in part to embarrass the ISU. The four-month strike idled 50,000 seamen and 300 ships along the Atlantic and Gulf coasts.

Believing it was time to abandon the conservative International Seamen's Union, Curran began to sign up members for a new, rival union. The level of organizing was so intense that hundreds of ships delayed their sailing time as seamen listened to organizers and signed union cards. One of the co-founders of the organization was the later civil rights activist James Peck.

In May 1937, Curran and other leaders of his Seamen's Defense Committee reconstituted the group as the National Maritime Union. (CPUSA co-founder Boleslaw Gerbert may have helped form this union. It held its first convention in July, and 30,000 seamen left the ISU to join the NMU. Curran was elected president of the new organization. The black, Jamaican-born Ferdinand Smith was elected as the union's secretary-treasurer. Within a year, the NMU had more than 50,000 members, and most American shippers were under contract.

Immediately after the NMU's founding convention in July 1937, Curran and other seamen's union leaders were invited by John L. Lewis to come to Washington, D.C., to form a major organizing drive among ship and port workers. The unions comprised by the CIO had been ejected by the American Federation of Labor (AFL) in November 1936, and now Lewis wanted to launch a maritime union. His goal was to create a union as large and influential as the Steel Workers Organizing Committee out of the nation's 300,000 maritime workers.  Although Lewis favored Harry Bridges, president of the Pacific Coast District of the International Longshoremen's Association, to lead the new maritime industrial union, the other union leaders balked. Curran agreed to affiliate with the CIO, but refused to let Bridges or anyone else take over his union. His views were reflected among those of the other union leaders, and the CIO's maritime industrial union never got off the ground.

By 1946, the NMU had 46 branches, a staff of 500, and 73,000 members.

In 1948, Lee Pressman joined Joseph Forer, a Washington-based attorney, in representing Ferdinand C. Smith, secretary of the National Maritime Union along with Gerhard Eisler, supposedly the top Soviet intelligence agent in the US, Irving Potash, vice president of the Fur and Leather Workers Union; Charles A. Doyle of the Gas, Coke and Chemical Workers Union, and John Williamson, labor secretary of the CPUSA).  On May 5, 1946, Pressman and Forer received a preliminary injunction so their defendants might have hearings with examiners unconnected with the investigations and prosecutions by examiners of the Immigration and Naturalization Service.

Expansion
In 1958 the union decided on an aggressive building program, and hired New Orleans-based architect Albert C. Ledner to design some unique buildings for them, including a headquarters building at Seventh Avenue between 12th Street and 13th Street, completed in 1964, a block-through service annex at 346 West 17th Street and a plaza and "pizza-box"-shaped companion building next to it on Ninth Avenue, both built in 1966 and both named for Joseph Curran. The Curran buildings held offices for the union and its pension fund, medical and training facilities, dormitory rooms for seaman, a gymnasium, swimming pool and 900-seat auditorium.

In 1973, with the union's fortunes fading with the decreased activity in the Port of New York, the headquarters building was sold to St. Vincent's Hospital. The 17th Street and Ninth Avenue buildings were sold in 1987 to Covenant House, a drug rehabilitation program, for use as a runaway shelter and educational facility.

Mergers

In 1988 the NMU agreed to merge with the Marine Engineers' Beneficial Association (MEBA) to form District 1, MEBA-NMU. The merger did not last. MEBA members charged that the merger referendum was rigged by MEBA president C. E. "Gene" DeFries. The accusations were serious enough that the United States Department of Justice began an investigation. Union members were even more outraged when they learned DeFries and five other union officers paid themselves more than $2 million in severance payments. During the course of their findings, a group of MEBA members (Led by Alex Shandrowsky, Jesse Calhoon, and Don Keefe) peacefully occupied MEBA's Headquarters in Washington, DC after DeFries refused to disclose information to union members. DeFries and others were later indicted for crimes relating to their manipulation of union elections and misuse of union offices. US versus DeFries (et al.) became the first successful criminal Racketeer Influenced and Corrupt Organizations Act (RICO) prosecution of the governing body of a labor organization, which resulted in the conviction of 18 officials of MEBA), for RICO, RICO conspiracy, embezzlement, extortion, and mail fraud. NMU disaffiliated from the Marine Engineers in 1993.

Louis Parise was elected the newly independent union's president.

In 1999 the NMU became an autonomous affiliate of the Seafarers International Union of North America, and in 2001 it fully merged with that union (now called "Seafarers International Union").

Presidents

 Joseph Curran, (1937–1973)
 Shannon J. Wall, (1973–1990)
 Louis Parise, (1990–1997)
 Rene Lioanjie, (1997–2001)

See also

 American Maritime Officers
 Marine Engineers' Beneficial Association
 Sailors' Union of the Pacific
 Seafarers International Union
 United States Merchant Marine
 Marine Firemen's Union

Footnotes

Further reading
 Barbanel, Josh. "Joseph Curran, 75, Founder of National Maritime Union." New York Times. August 15, 1981.
 Butler, John A. Sailing on Friday: The Perilous Voyage of America's Merchant Marine. Washington, D.C.: Potomac Books, 1997. 
 "C.I.O. Goes to Sea." Time. July 19, 1937.
 Goldberg, Joseph P. The Maritime Story: A Study in Labor-Management Relations. Cambridge, Mass.: Harvard University Press, 1958.
 Herbert, Brian. The Forgotten Heroes: The Heroic Story of the United States Merchant Marine. New York: Forge Books, 2004. 
 
 Kempton, Murray. Part of Our Time: Some Monuments and Ruins of the Thirties. Hardcover reprint ed. New York: Random House, 1998. (Originally published in 1955.)
 King, Jerry et al., We Accuse (From the Record): A Factual History of the Seamen's Labor Movement. New York: n.p., 1940.

 "Politics and Pork Chops." Time. June 17, 1946.
 "Retired Union Boss Joseph Curran Dies." Associated Press. August 14, 1981.
 Schwartz, Stephen. Brotherhood of the Sea: The Sailors' Union of the Pacific, 1885–1985. New York: Transaction Publishers, 1986. .
 Shorrock, Tim. "Labor Leaders Dissolve Merger of MEBA, NMU." Journal of Commerce. June 8, 1993.
 Shorrock, Tim. "Two Former MEBA Leaders Indicted." Journal of Commerce. July 1, 1993.
 "SIU-A&G and NMU Set Merger Vote." West Coast Sailors''. April 20, 2001.

External links

AFL–CIO
Trade unions in the United States
Maritime history of the United States
Seafarers' trade unions
Trade unions established in 1937
Trade unions disestablished in 2001
1937 establishments in the United States